The Department of Housing, Local Government and Heritage is a department of the Government of Ireland. It is led by the Minister for Housing, Local Government and Heritage.

Departmental team
The official headquarters and ministerial offices of the department are in The Custom House, Dublin. The departmental team consists of the following:
Minister for Housing, Local Government and Heritage: Darragh O'Brien, TD
Minister of State for Local Government and Planning: Kieran O'Donnell, TD
Minister of State for Heritage and Electoral Reform: Malcolm Noonan, TD
Secretary General of the Department: Graham Doyle

Overview

The official headquarters and ministerial offices of the department are in The Custom House, Dublin 1.

The department is responsible for, among other matters:
housing
the Radiological Protection Institute of Ireland
local authorities and related services
the supervision of elections including the general election and presidential elections, and electronic voting arrangements
Met Éireann, the weather forecasting service.
Tailte Éireann, a planned agency for surveying, registering ownership, and valuing land. It would combine the existing functions of Ordnance Survey Ireland, the Property Registration Authority, and the Valuation Office (founded for Griffith's Valuation).

History
In the Ministry of Dáil Éireann in the Irish Republic (1919–22), a Ministry of Local Government was established on 2 April 1919. In the Irish Free State, there was a Minister for Local Government as part of the first Executive Council of the Irish Free State established in 1922. The Department of Local Government and Public Health was given a statutory basis by the Ministers and Secretaries Act 1924. This act provided it with:

It also assigned it with the following agencies:
The Local Government Board for Ireland, including appeals under the Old Age Pensions Acts.
The Inspectors of Lunatic Asylums in Ireland.
National Health Insurance Commission.
The Registrar-General of Births, Deaths and Marriages in Ireland.
Roads Department (formerly Ministry of Transport).
Clerk of the Crown and Hanaper so far as concerned with Elections.
General Nursing Council and Central Midwives Board.

Over the years the name and functions of the department have changed several times by means of statutory instruments.

Alteration of name and transfer of functions

External links
 
History of the Department
Structure of the Department

References

 
Housing
Ireland, Housing
1919 establishments in Ireland
Ireland
Ireland